Kagetaka (written: 景隆) is a masculine Japanese surname. Notable people with the name include:

 (1554–1591), Japanese samurai
 (1540–1597), Japanese pirate
 (1526–1585), Japanese samurai

Japanese masculine given names